Cottey College is a private women's college in Nevada, Missouri. It was founded by Virginia Alice (Cottey) Stockard in 1884. Since 1927 it has been owned and supported by the P.E.O. Sisterhood, a philanthropic women's organization based in Des Moines, Iowa. For most of its history, Cottey was a two-year liberal arts college, and in 2011 it achieved accreditation as a four-year baccalaureate-granting college. It had 302 full-time students enrolled in 2021.

The main campus occupies 11 city blocks. Five blocks south is B.I.L. Hill, a private lodge that rests above a public park which includes a walking trail, gazebo, and small lake. BIL Hill is used by Cottey students, faculty, and staff for recreation, concerts, bonfires, picnics, suite nights, and other traditions.

History

Beginnings

Cottey College was founded by Virginia Alice Cottey (known as Alice Cottey) in 1884; she originally called it Vernon Seminary, based on the county. After teaching at Central College in Lexington, Missouri since 1875, Cottey decided she wanted to establish her own school. She had saved $3,000, and her sisters Dora and Mary lent her nearly $3,000 of their savings to begin the school.

Several towns bid for the opportunity to host the new girls' school, including Fort Worth, Texas and several towns in Missouri. After much thought, Cottey accepted the offer of Nevada in Vernon County, although it was not the most generous. Residents donated  of land upon which Cottey had a three-story brick building constructed. After the college expanded, this building came to be known as Main Hall.

Vernon Seminary opened its doors in 1884 as a primary, intermediate, and collegiate preparatory school. In those early years, before educational standardization in the U.S., placement of students depended more upon their accomplishments than age. In 1886 the school's name was officially changed to Cottey College. By 1932, the college consisted only of the higher education part, offering a two-year program.

In 1927, Cottey offered the college to the P.E.O. Sisterhood (Philanthropic Educational Organization), an international organization based in Des Moines, Iowa that supports women's education. She made a condition that they raise a $200,000 endowment for the college (about $2.9 million in 2018 dollars), in order to maintain and operate it for the long term.  The P.E.O. accepted, and have since owned and operated the private Cottey College.

Enrollment
Enrollment grew from 28 to 72 students during the first year, and by 1910 there were 250 students. Attendance dropped during the 1930s and '40s, but rose to maximum capacity of 350 by the 1970s.

With more two-year local community colleges opening in the later 20th century, Cottey had a slow decline in enrollment during the 1990s and into the 2000s. It was also a period when some young women preferred co-ed institutions in larger communities. The college worked to restore enrollment and to expand its offerings to a full, four-year curriculum, which it achieved in 2011. By 2017, the number of students totaled 307.

Student life

Residential life

Students come from more than 40 states and 20 different countries. In the 2018–19 school year, international students came from Angola, Burundi, Ethiopia, France, Ghana, Guatemala, India, Jamaica, Japan, Kenya, Malawi, Mexico, Myanmar, Nepal, Nigeria], South Africa, Eswatini, Uganda, United Kingdom, and Zimbabwe.

Cottey students live in one of three campus halls (P.E.O., Reeves, and Robertson), each having between 10 and 14 suites. These include a few bedrooms, a bathroom, and a kitchenette arranged around a living room. Student rooms have typical college furnishings. Suites are occupied by between 8 and 12 students. Most suites are sponsored by a P.E.O. chapter, and suite members usually receive several care packages from these P.E.O.s during the year. Sponsorship of some suites has changed over time, their names changing as well.

Residence halls
P.E.O. Hall is the oldest of the existing dormitories, and was erected in 1939. It has 10 suites, housing about 100 students. It was the first building to be paid by the P.E.O. Sisterhood after they acquired the college.

Reeves Hall was built in 1949 on the site where a prior Cottey dorm, Missouri Hall, had burned down in 1940. Like P.E.O., it houses 10 suites and about 100 students. It is noted for having the largest basement of the three halls, and a foyer reminiscent of a classic hotel lobby.

Robertson Hall (Robbie) was the last Cottey dorm to be built, being erected in 1959. It houses 14 suites (about 150 students) as well as the college's dining facility, Raney Dining Hall and the Centennial Room. It is noted for being the only hall with air conditioning and an elevator, and for having the smallest basement.

Each hall has recreational rooms, computer suites, laundry facilities, and quiet study rooms elsewhere in each building.

Cottey has had several prior dormitories, including Rosemary Hall (est. 1903) and Missouri Hall (1928–1940). Main Hall was also used as a dorm from 1884 to 1939.

International experience
In 2000, the college established a spring trip abroad for second-year students and other eligible students. Since the first trip, international experience trip in 2000, each second-year class has traveled to one of several destinations: Paris, London, Barcelona, Madrid, Rome, or Florence. For each European destination, the cost of airfare and hotel stays have been paid by the college.  Alternative trips to destinations including Japan, Peru], Thailand], Guatemala], New Zealand have sometimes incurred additional fees.

Athletics
The Cottey athletic teams are called the Comets. The college is a member of the National Association of Intercollegiate Athletics (NAIA), primarily competing in the American Midwest Conference (AMC) since the 2022–23 academic year. The Comets previously competed as an NAIA Independent within the Continental Athletic Conference from 2018–19 to 2021–22.

Cottey competes in nine intercollegiate varsity sports: basketball, cross country, eSports, flag football (added in 2020), golf, softball, track and field (indoor and outdoor) and volleyball.

History
When intercollegiate athletics were re-introduced to the college in the 1998–99 academic year, the Comets competed in the National Junior College Athletic Association (NJCAA).

Notable alumnae 

Jetta Carleton '33 – author of The Moonflower Vine (1962), a New York Times Bestseller 
Dora Dougherty Strother '41 – Women Airforce Service Pilot, one of the first two women to pilot a B-29.
Ruby Kless Sondock '44 – First woman justice on the Texas Supreme Court
Francine Irving Neff '46 – Treasurer of the United States, 1974–1977
Marilyn Harris Springer '51 – Best-selling author of the Eden series and Hatter Fox.
Carol Littleton '62 – Film editor, nominated for an Oscar for E.T. The Extra-Terrestrial
Judith P. Morgan – Painter
Judith McCulloh – Folklorist, ethnomusicologist, and university press editor

References

Further reading
 Campbell, Elizabeth McClure. The Cottey Sisters of Missouri. Parkville, MO: Park College Press, 1970.
 Cottrell, Debbie Mauldin. "Mount Holyoke of the Midwest: Virginia Alice Cottey, Mary Lyon, and the founding of the Vernon Seminary for Young Ladies." Missouri Historical Review, vol. 90, no. 2 (Jan 1996), pp. 187–198.
 Stockard, Orpha Loraine. The First 75 Years: Cottey College.
 Troesch, Dr. Helen DeRusha. The Life of Virginia Alice Cottey Stockard. Wayside Press, Inc., 1955.

External links

 Official website
 Official athletics website

 
Women's universities and colleges in the United States
Liberal arts colleges in Missouri
Educational institutions established in 1884
Buildings and structures in Vernon County, Missouri
Education in Vernon County, Missouri
1884 establishments in Missouri
NJCAA athletics
Two-year colleges in the United States
Private universities and colleges in Missouri
Women in Missouri